Glutaredoxin-3 is a protein that in humans is encoded by the GLRX3 gene.

Interactions
GLRX3 has been shown to interact with PRKCQ.

References

Further reading

External links